John Thom is the name of:

 John Thom (soldier) (1891–1941), British lieutenant-colonel, judge and politician
 John Hamilton Thom (1808–1894), Irish Unitarian minister
 John Nichols Thom (1799–1838), Cornish wine-merchant and maltster